Night is a studio album by Holly Cole released in July 2012 on the Tradition & Moderne label in Germany, and in November 2012 on Universal Music in Canada. Night is the first studio album from Holly Cole since a 2007 self-titled release.  The album features pianist Aaron Davis, bassists David Piltch & Greg Cohen, drummer Davide DiRenzo, lap steel guitarist Greg Leisz, guitarist Kevin Breit, percussionist Cyro Baptista and Johnny Johnson on horns.  The album's fifth track is a cover of Elvis Presley's 'Viva Las Vegas'. Cole's other covers on the album include Tom Waits's "Walk Away" and Captain Beefheart's "Love Lies".

Track listing

References

External links
Official website
Allmusic 
Universalmusic.ca

Holly Cole albums
2012 albums